The 2007–08 season was the 107th season in Athletic Bilbao's history and their 77th consecutive season in La Liga, the top division of Spanish football.

Squad statistics

Appearances and goals

|}

Competitions

La Liga

League table

Copa del Rey

Quarter-finals

|}

External links

References

Athletic Bilbao
Athletic Bilbao seasons